Cole William De Vries (born February 12, 1985) is an American former professional baseball pitcher who played in Major League Baseball with the Minnesota Twins.

Amateur career
A native of St. Louis Park, Minnesota, De Vries attended Eden Prairie High School and the University of Minnesota, where he played college baseball for the Golden Gophers. In 2006, he played collegiate summer baseball with the Brewster Whitecaps of the Cape Cod Baseball League. De Vries signed with the Twins as a non-drafted free agent on August 22, .

Professional career
De Vries spent the  season with the Twins' advanced A affiliate, the Fort Myers Miracle. In the first half of the season, De Vries went 5–5 with a 3.11 earned run average and 47 strike outs over 13 appearances (12 starts) in Fort Myers' quest for the Florida State League first-half West Division title. De Vries pitched 6.2 innings of scoreless ball in the first playoff game against the second half division winners, the Dunedin Blue Jays to earn the 2–1 win for the Miracle in Dunedin.

In his first start of the  season, De Vries led New Britain to their first victory, pitching 5 innings, and giving up only one earned run against the New Hampshire Fisher Cats, the Eastern League Double A farm club of the Toronto Blue Jays. For the season, he went 7–14 with a 4.84 ERA in 26 starts. He was used exclusively out of the bullpen with the Red Wings, producing a 5.06 ERA and ten strike outs in five appearances before returning to New Britain.

On May 22, 2012, De Vries was promoted by the Twins to replace Jason Marquis, who was designated for assignment.

De Vries debuted in the Major Leagues on May 24, 2012 and achieved his first Major League win on June 4, 2012 against the Kansas City Royals.

De Vries was outrighted off the Twins roster on October 2, 2013. He retired after the season.

Awards
 Minnesota All-State High School Team
 Class 3A High School Player of the Year (2003)
 All-Big Ten (Second-Team)
 Midwest League All-Star
 Brodie Trophy 2007 Player of the Year (Co-winner with Alex Burnett)

References

External links

1985 births
Living people
Baseball players from Minnesota
Minnesota Twins players
Beloit Snappers players
Fort Myers Miracle players
New Britain Rock Cats players
Rochester Red Wings players
Gulf Coast Twins players
Minnesota Golden Gophers baseball players
Brewster Whitecaps players
Mankato MoonDogs players